The Gay Parisienne is an Edwardian musical comedy in two acts with a libretto by George Dance.  It premiered at the Opera House in Northampton, England, in October 1894, with music by Ernest Rousden.   It was revived in London (after a tryout in a smaller London theatre in March 1896) on 4 April 1896, with music by Ivan Caryll, where it ran for 369 performances at the Duke of York's Theatre, starring W. H. Denny as Major Fossdyke, Frank Wheeler as Auguste and Ada Reeve as Julie.

The piece toured internationally, adapted in New York with new songs and material by Edgar Smith and Nat. D. Mann as The Girl from Paris, opening on 8 December 1896, at the Herald Square Theatre and running for 266 or 281 performances (sources differ) and then touring. It was later revived at Wallack's Theatre in New York. The original version played on the European continent and Australia as The Gay Parisienne.

Roles
Mr. Ebenezer Honeycomb – Lionel Rignold
Mrs. Honeycomb – Lily Belmore
Amos Dingle, Honeycomb's friend – Hubert Willis
Nora Honeycomb – Violet Robinson
Mabel, Nora's friend – Marion Dolby
Mlle. Julie Bon Bon, The Gay Perisienne – Ada Reeve
Tom Everleigh, A barrister – Edgar Stevens
Ruth, Honeycomb's servant – Louie Freear
M. Auguste Pompier, A French spy – Frank Wheeler
Major Fossdyke, of the Battersea Butterfly Shooters – W. H. Denny
Ethel, Angela, Edith, Violet, May, Gladys, Rose and Maud, The Major's daughters – E. Carlton, Violet Ellicott, Rose Montgomery, Ivy Hertzog, Edith Stuart, Edith Bartlett, Maud Hoppe and Edith Mada 
Blatterwater, A gendarme – Mr. Ackerman May
Gretchen – Harriet Wood
Hans, Proprietor of the Spa Hotel, Schoffenburgen – Harry Kilburn
Anna and Fritz, Servants – Edith Milton and Mr. Garth
Cecil Smyth and Percy Tooting, Ducle's friends – P. Leslie and C. Guildford
Algernon P. Ducle, An American – James Francis

Synopsis
Mr. Honeycomb is restrained and decorous while in England but abroad, he is unfettered, including on a trip to Paris.  Mlle. Julie Bon-Bon of Paris sues him for breach of promise.  Afraid of his wife's wrath, Honeycomb flees to Switzerland and is reported drowned.  His supposed widow seeks his remains, accompanied by her friend, Major Fossdyke.  Meanwhile, Honeycomb sees them together in Switzerland, and pretending righteous anger, he turns the tables.

Musical numbers

Act I
Hail for the Thames on a Summer's Day—Chorus
So Take You a Warning—Ebenezer Honeycomb and Chorus
Somebody—Tom Everleigh and Nora Honeycomb
The Battersea Butterfly Shooters—Major Fossdyke and Chorus
I'm All the Way from Gay Paree—Mlle. Julie Bon Bon and Auguste Pompier
Then Off We Go
Tweedledum and Tweedledee—Ebenezer and Julie
Cock-a-doodle—Julie, Auguste, Mrs. Honeycomb and Ebenezer
Hail, the Hero of the Day—Chorus

Act II
Isn't It Wonderful—Chorus
The Festive Continong—Tom, Percy Tooting, Cecil Smyth and Algernon P. Ducle
First and Third—Ebenezer and Julie
Sister Mary Jane's Top Note—Ruth and Chorus
Oh, Tender Remembrance—Nora and Chorus
Tootle, Tootle—Mrs. Honeycomb, Major Fossdyke, Ruth and Auguste
Ding-Dong
Upon the Stage Let's Have a Fling—Ruth and Major Fossdyke
Carnival—Chorus
Just for a Kiss
The Girl from Paris
He Took It In a Good-natured Way

Notes

References
Brown, Thomas Allston.  A History of the New York Stage from the First Performance in 1732 to 1901 (1903) Dodd, Mead and company, New York. p. 388

External links
Information about the Broadway production

West End musicals
Broadway musicals
1896 musicals